Christopher A. Humbert (born December 27, 1969 in Modesto, California) is a former water polo center forward from the United States, who competed in three Summer Olympics (1992, 1996 and 2000) for his native country. He was part of the United States national team squads that won the gold medal in the 1991 FINA World Cup in Barcelona and the gold medal in the 1997 FINA World Cup in Athens.

At club level, he played overseas in Italy and Greece. From 1992 to 1994 he played for Italian giants Posillipo, with whom he won 2 Italian Championships. In 2002–03 season, he played for Greek powerhouse Olympiacos, with whom he won the LEN Super Cup, the Greek Championship and the Greek Cup.

In 2018, he was inducted into the USA Water Polo Hall of Fame.

See also
 List of men's Olympic water polo tournament top goalscorers

References

External links
 
 Chris Humbert profile at h2opolo.com

1969 births
Living people
American male water polo players
Water polo centre forwards
Left-handed water polo players
Olympic water polo players of the United States
Water polo players at the 1992 Summer Olympics
Water polo players at the 1996 Summer Olympics
Water polo players at the 2000 Summer Olympics
Pan American Games medalists in water polo
Pan American Games gold medalists for the United States
Water polo players at the 1991 Pan American Games
Water polo players at the 1995 Pan American Games
Olympiacos Water Polo Club players
Panathinaikos Water Polo Club players
Sportspeople from Modesto, California
Medalists at the 1991 Pan American Games
Medalists at the 1995 Pan American Games
Ethnikos Piraeus Water Polo Club players